Dermot Gilleran is an Irish cyclist. He won the Rás Tailteann in 1982.

Career
Dermot Gilleran won the Rás Tailteann in 1982.

References

External links

Living people
Irish male cyclists
Rás Tailteann winners
Year of birth missing (living people)